C-type lectin domain family 4 member F is a protein that in humans is encoded by the CLEC4F gene.

References

Further reading